Melanophila acuminata, known generally as the black fire beetle or fire bug, is a species of metallic wood-boring beetle in the family Buprestidae. It is found in the Caribbean, Europe and Northern Asia (excluding China), Central America, North America, and Southern Asia. They get their common name due to the fact that they swarm freshly burned conifer trees, which they find using sensors on their thorax. Adults are black and 7-11 mm in length.

References

Further reading

External links

 

Buprestidae
Articles created by Qbugbot
Beetles described in 1774
Taxa named by Charles De Geer